Denise Parmentier (born 5 January 1915) was a Belgian gymnast. She competed in the women's artistic team all-around at the 1948 Summer Olympics.

References

External links
  

1915 births
Year of death missing
Belgian female artistic gymnasts
Olympic gymnasts of Belgium
Gymnasts at the 1948 Summer Olympics
Sportspeople from Liège